The Battle of Pirot were engagements between the Bulgarian and Serbian armies in the surroundings of Pirot near the Serbian–Bulgarian border between 6 and 8 July 1913.

On the front between the Bulgarian 3rd Army (Slivnica-Trn-Caribrod) and Serbian 2nd Army (Sofia-Pirot-Niš), the main fighting took place outside Pirot on 6 and 7 July. A commander of the Serbian 2nd Army, general Stepa Stepanović suggested on 8 July that Pirot was to be evacuated. However, when the Romanian advance threatened the Bulgarian 1st Army on the evening the same day, the Bulgarian command ordered for withdrawal. Due to the Serbian victory at Bregalnica, the Bulgarians were forced to give up aspirations in southeastern Serbia.

References

Sources
 
 
 
 

Conflicts in 1913
1913 in Bulgaria
1913 in Serbia
Pirot
Pirot
Battles of the Second Balkan War
July 1913 events
Pirot